Martin Doktor (born 21 May 1974 in Polička, Czechoslovakia) is the Czech Republic's best-known sprint canoeist. He was double Olympic champion in the Canadian canoe C-1 discipline at the 1996 Summer Olympics in Atlanta. During the 1996 games, his mother cooked knedliky (Dumplings in Czech), using dozens of kg of flour brought over from the Czech Republic.

Doktor went on to win 14 medals at the ICF Canoe Sprint World Championships, including two golds (C-1 200 m: 1998, C-1 500 m: 1997), nine silvers (C-1 200 m: 1997, 1999, 2003; C-1 500 m: 1995, 1999; C-1 1000 m: 1995, 1997, 1998, 2001), and three bronzes (C-1 500 m: 2003, C-1 1000 m: 1999, C-4 1000 m: 1998). He was also European C-1 1000 m champion in 1997 and 2000.

At the 2004 Summer Olympics Doktor was unfortunate not to add to his medal tally, coming in fourth in the C-1 1000 m final and fifth in the C-1 500 m.

His most recent medal success came at the 2006 European Championships, held in Račice, Czech Republic, where he won the C-1 200 m silver medal.

Doktor, nicknamed Boban, remains one of canoeing's most consistent performers. At the 2006 ICF Canoe Sprint World Championships he entered all three C-1 events, reaching the final in each. He finished fourth in the 200 m, fifth in the 500 m, and eighth in the 1000 m.

He is 178 cm (5'10") tall and weighs 78 kg (172 lbs).

References

Wallechinsky, David and Jaime Loucky (2008). "Canoeing: Men's Canadian Singles 500 Meters". In The Complete Book of the Olympics: 2008 Edition. London: Aurum Press Limited. pp. 479, 481.

1974 births
Living people
People from Polička
Canoeists at the 1996 Summer Olympics
Canoeists at the 2000 Summer Olympics
Canoeists at the 2004 Summer Olympics
Czech male canoeists
Olympic canoeists of the Czech Republic
Olympic gold medalists for the Czech Republic
Olympic medalists in canoeing
ICF Canoe Sprint World Championships medalists in Canadian
Medalists at the 1996 Summer Olympics
Sportspeople from the Pardubice Region